is a Japanese manufacturer of airsoft guns and toy cars located in Adachi, Tokyo, and are famous for pioneering the design of battery-powered airsoft guns.  Their products are principally sold in Japan, but are also exported worldwide.

The company had its own center for airsoft sport called Tokyo Marui BB Sports Field which was operated during 2009 and 2010. The guns have appeared in numerous movies and it has merchandising arrangements with many games .

Automatic electric guns 
Tokyo Marui was the first company to introduce airsoft guns powered solely by electric motor gearbox-driven spring-piston assembly in 1992, which they called "automatic electric gun" (AEG).  This compact air pump system was implemented in their first battery-powered automatic firing replica, the FAMAS F1.  Other airsoft guns were then introduced. The 3-gear AEG design developed by Tokyo Marui is still in use today, and has been copied numerous times through the years by many other airsoft manufacturers.

Tokyo Marui's airsoft replicas were made primarily from ABS plastic bodies, but also used metal parts where needed. Their more recent models, such as the Type 89 and AK-74M rifles have had full metal externals. The internal gearboxes of these guns are primarily powered by rechargeable batteries.

Tokyo Marui makes the following AEGs:

M14 series
M14 SOCOM
M14 (fiber-type stock)
M14 (wood-type stock)
M16 & M4 series
Colt M16A1
Colt M16A1 Vietnam version
Colt M16A2
Colt M16 Golgo 13 (Limited edition)
Colt M733 Commando
Colt M4A1 R.I.S.
Colt M4A1 carbine New-type
Colt M4 SOPMOD (Electric Blow Back)
Colt M4 S-System
Colt M4 P.M.C
Colt M4A1 SOCOM Carbine (Electric Blow Back)
Colt M4 CQB-R Black (Electric Blow Back)
Colt M4 CQB-R Dark earth (Electric Blow Back)
H&K 416 (Electric Blow Back)
H&K 416 DEVGRU Custom (Electric Blow Back)
H&K 416 Delta Custom (Electric Blow Back)
H&K 416C (Electric Blow Back)
H&K 416D (Electric Blow Back)
Knight's M4 SR-16
Colt M4A1
Colt M993 Tan (limited edition)
Colt XM177E2 (discontinued)
Colt CAR-15 (discontinued)
Colt M653 Barnes version (limited edition)
RECCE Rifle (Electric Blow Back)
MP5 and G36 series 

H&K G36C
H&K G36K (Electric Blow-Back)
H&K MP5A5 High-Cycle
MP5-J
MP5-K
MP5-K High Cycle
MP5-K PDW
H&K MP5SD5
H&K MP5SD6
H&K MP5KA4 PDW
H&K MP5A4 High Grade
H&K MP5A5 High Grade
H&K MP5 R.A.S.
H&K MP5KA4
H&K MP5 Navy (Limited Edition)
P90 series
P90
P90 Triple Rail
PS90 High-Cycle
FAMAS & Steyr series
Steyr AUG Special Receiver

Steyr AUG Military-type (discontinued)
Steyr AUG High-Cycle
FA-MAS Special Version
FA-MAS 5.56-F1 (First AEG ever made)
SIG series
SIG SG 550 (discontinued, due to burst fire microchip malfunctions)
SIG SG 551 (discontinued, due to burst fire microchip malfunctions)
SIG SG 552-2 SEALS

AK series
AK-47
AK-47S
AK-47 Spetsnaz (limited edition)
AK-47 Beta Spetsnaz
AK-47 High-Cycle
AK-74MN (Electric Blow Back)
AKS-74U (Electric Blow Back)
AK-102 (Electric Blow Back)
AK-47 Type 3 (Electric Blow Back)
G3 series
H&K G3A3 (discontinued)
H&K G3A4 (discontinued)
H&K MC51
H&K G3 SAS
H&K G3 SAS High-Cycle
H&K PSG-1
H&K G3/SG1
HK51 (limited edition)
Howa Type 89 series
Howa Type 89 (the government-issued supplies model for Japanese army as JGSDF; it is used by soldiers when training for CQB)
Howa Type 89 (the hobby model for private citizens)
Howa Type 89-F (AEG based on folding stock variant of standard Type 89 rifle for airborne/special forces, both civilian hobby and JSDF training models available)
Other
Heckler & Koch MP7A1

Uzi submachine gun (Discontinued)
Thompson M1A1

FN SCAR H
FN SCAR L
Automatic Electric Shotguns
AA-12
SGR-12
"Thor's Hammer" (Longer SGR-12)

Automatic electric pistols 
Automatic electric pistols (AEP) run on 7.2V rechargeable batteries. These pistols and compact submachine guns are often more reliable than gas-powered replicas in cold weather. However, due to their lower voltage supplies and miniature gearboxes, they usually generate lower muzzle speeds (about 0.25 - .5J per BB, 25–50 m/s for 0.2g BB) and slightly slower rates of fire than replicas using a full-sized gearbox system.

Tokyo Marui makes the following automatic electric pistols:

 H&K USP
 M93R
 Glock 18C
 MP7A1
 Škorpion vz. 61
 Beretta M9a1 
 Steyr Mannlicher TMP (cancelled)
 MAC-10
 H&K P30
 Škorpion vz. 61

AEG Boys series
Tokyo Marui makes LPAEG replicas scaled down for use by children from the age of 10. They are powered by 6 AA batteries and have lower power than their 1:1 scale counterparts.
H&K MP5A5
Colt M4A1 carbine
H&K G36C
Colt M4 SOPMOD
AK-47

Electric blowback pistols
Some models may be select fire, and most models have an additional grip safety that must be held in order for the pistol to fire, with the exception of the Combat Delta models that use the gun's usual grip safety. The pistols feature a very weak blowback, and the slide usually only moves a third of the distance that it would on a typical GBB or real firearm.

SIG Pro SP2340
Combat Delta (Colt Delta Elite 10mm)
Combat Delta Silver Model
M92F Military
M92F Silver Model
Desert Eagle .50AE
Desert Eagle .50AE Silver
KP85
Centimeter Master
Glock 18C
H&K P30
Ingram MAC-11 (New)
Beretta M9A1
Beretta M9A1 Silver

Gas blowback pistols
Tokyo Marui Gas blowback pistols are designed to use HFC134A refrigerant to fire BBs and also to blow back the slide, mimicking the recoil of automatic hand guns. Refrigerant is sold in canisters similar to small propane canisters used in portable gas range.  Propane based "Green" gas can be used, but could damage the replica due to higher pressure it exerts to mostly plastic parts used in gas blowback replicas, but many replicas have proven safe to use with propane or green gas.

Desert Eagle Series:
Desert Eagle .50AE Non-Hard-Kick
Desert Eagle .50AE Hard-Kick
Desert Eagle .50AE 10"
Desert Eagle .50AE Chrome Stainless
Desert Eagle .50AE Biohazard 2 (1998 Limited Edition)
Desert Eagle .50AE Biohazard 2 10" Custom Ver. 98' Two-Tone (Limited Edition)
Desert Eagle .50AE Biohazard 2 10" Custom Ver. 2007 Chrome (Limited Edition)
Desert Eagle .50AE Hard-Kick Full Metal (Limited Edition)

Detonics .45 Series:
Detonics .45 Combat Master
Detonics .45 Combat Master Enviro Hard Chrome
Detonics .45 Combat Master Chrome Frame
Detonics .45 Combat Master Chrome Slide

Glock Series:
Glock 17
Glock 17 Custom Dark Earth
Glock 17 Custom Foliage Green
Glock 18c
Glock 19
Glock 22
Glock 26
Glock 26 Advance (Tokyo Marui custom)
Glock 34

Hi-Capa/ M1911 Series:
Hi-Capa 4.3 (Tokyo Marui custom)
Hi-Capa 4.3 Dual Stainless Custom (Tokyo Marui custom)
Hi-Capa 5.1 (Tokyo Marui custom)
Hi-Capa 5.1 Stainless (Tokyo Marui custom)
Hi-Capa 5.1 R-Series Silver (Tokyo Marui custom)
Hi-Capa 5.1 R-Series Black (Tokyo Marui custom)
Hi-Capa 5.1 Match Custom (Tokyo Marui custom)
Hi-Capa D.O.R
Hi-Capa Xtreme .45 (Fully Automatic) (Tokyo Marui custom)
M.E.U (Marine Expeditionary Unit)
M1911A1 Colt Government
Desert Warrior 4.3 (Tokyo Marui custom)
Foliage Warrior 4.3 (Tokyo Marui custom)
Night Warrior (Tokyo Marui custom)
Strike Warrior (Tokyo Marui custom)
1911 Series 70
1911 Series 70 Nickel Plated version
M45A1 CQB

Beretta M92 Series:
M9 Tactical Master (Tokyo Marui custom)
M92F Chrome Stainless
M92F Military Model
M92F Duo-Tone (Black slide with silver frame)
M92F Duo-Tone (Black frame with silver slide)
M92F Biohazard Samurai Edge Standard Model
M92F Biohazard Samurai Edge Jill Model 1999-2000 (Limited Edition)
M92F Biohazard Samurai Edge Chris Model 2000 (Limited Edition)
M92F Biohazard Samurai Edge Barry Model C/S.E-03 2001 (Limited Edition)
M9A1
M9A1 silver version

SIG Sauer Series:
SIG Sauer P226
SIG Sauer P226 Stainless
SIG Sauer P226 Silver Frame
SIG Sauer P226 Silver Slide
SIG Sauer P226E2

Others:
FN Five-Seven
Beretta PX4 Storm
Springfield XDM .40
Heckler & Koch USP Compact
Heckler & Koch USP
HK45 Tactical
S&W M&P9
S&W 4506 (Discontinued)
Browning Hi-Power (Discontinued)

Fixed slide gas pistols

Also known as "Non-Blowback" pistols.

AMT Hardballer
Centimeter Master
Desert Eagle
Mk23 SOCOM (High grade, Movable slide)
Steyr M-GB (Movable slide)
Wilson Super Grade

Gas revolvers
Colt Python 
Colt Python  Chrome Stainless
Colt Python 
Colt Python  Chrome Stainless
Colt Python 
Colt Python  Chrome Stainless
M19 Combat Magnum  (Relaunched)
M19 Combat Magnum  (Relaunched)
M19 Combat Magnum  (Relaunched)
Smith & Wesson M66 
Smith & Wesson M66 
Smith & Wesson M66

Gas Blowback Machine Guns
Recently, Tokyo Marui has delved into the world of Gas Blowback Machine Guns. These replicas work very similarly to Tokyo Marui's Gas Blowback Pistols, in that they use HFC134A refrigerant to blowback the bolt assembly to mimic the recoil of an automatic rifle or sub-machine gun when shooting the BBs.

Tokyo Marui has made gas powered replicas of these machine guns:

Heckler & Koch MP7|MP7A1
Colt M4A1 MWS (Released in 2015)
MTR16
Howa Type 89 (released in 2017)
Walther MPL (Discontinued shell-ejecting gas blowback sub-machine gun.)
Heckler & Koch MP5A3 (Discontinued shell-ejecting gas blowback sub-machine gun.)

Bolt action air rifle
These are bolt-action "sniper" rifles. Before each shot is fired, the shooter has to pull the bolt, cock the piston and load a BB into the chamber.  All three versions of the VSR-10 share the same stock, same internals and same air chamber. The Pro-sniper version has a black stock, 430 mm long inner barrel and is the most accurate of the three versions.  The Real Shock version has a metal weight in the piston to simulate recoil.  Real Shock has a simulated wooden stock and the same 430 mm long inner barrel.  However, due to the vibration caused by the heavier piston's impact, Real Shock is the least accurate of the three, albeit only by less than an inch difference at 20 m distance.  G-spec is shortened version with a silencer attached.  Inner barrel is 303 mm long, but has a slightly tighter bore.  Due to short inner barrel its accuracy is close to Real Shock, but a couple mm more accurate.  A needle-like contraption called air brake protrudes from the piston.  The air brake plugs the cylinder before piston impacts, trapping a small amount of air between the piston and cylinder.  This reduces impact vibration and adds to VSR series' unique accuracy.

VSR-10 Pro-sniper version
VSR-10 Pro-sniper version Tan
VSR-10 Pro-hunter version
VSR-10 Pro-hunter version Black
VSR-10 Real Stock Version Wood
VSR-10 G-Spec
VSR-10 G-Spec OD
L96 AWS Black
L96 AWS OD
M40A5 Black
M40A5 OD

Air shotgun and air rifles
Tokyo Marui makes several replicas that are powered by compressing a spring. For the shotgun and grenade launcher models, each shot fires three BBs at a time.

M3 Super 90
M3 Shorty
SPAS-12 
SPAS-12 (Discontinued) Metal Stock version
M203 grenade launcher for M16A1 and M16A2
M203 grenade launcher for M4A1, M4A1 RIS, and Knight's SR-16
Tactical launcher, an M203 with stock and pistol grip for standalone use
XM177E2
M16A1
MP5A3
Uzi SMG
Heckler & Koch G3A3
Walther MPL 
Kel-Tec KSG
Walther MPK (Discontinued)

Spring Pistols
The spring is compressed by racking the slide. Some have hop-up and some do not.
HP Browning Competition (Discontinued)
Nambu Type 14 (Discontinued)
Walther P38
(AMC) .44 Auto Mag
(Springfield Armory) Omega 10mm Auto
Colt M1911A1 Government
(Smith & Wesson) M645
Desert Eagle (.44)
SIG P228 High Grade
Glock 17L High Grade
Glock 17 High Grade
(Ruger) KP85 High Grade
H&K P7M13 
(AMT/IAI) Auto Mag III High Grade
S&W PC356
(Beretta) M8000 Cougar G
(Colt Mk IV Series 80) Centimeter Master
(H&K) SOCOM Mk 23 High Grade (Named one of the best spring pistols ever made.)
H&K USP High Grade
CZ 75 High Grade
Colt Double Eagle
(Beretta) M92F Military Model High Grade
Biohazard Ashford Luger Model (Limited Edition)
AMT Hardballer
Browning Hi-Power Competition (Discontinued)
Colt Python (Black or Silver)
P08 Luger (Discontinued)
Colt Single Action Army (Black or Silver)

Gindan Pistols
Tokyo Marui makes a small series of semi-automatic guns that fire by compressing the spring and releasing it as the trigger is pulled. These are mostly marketed at children in various colors, but Tokyo Marui has released black and silver editions which come in more professional looking boxes. The barrels create a short range hop-up effect. Tokyo Marui only recommends that a special .12 g silver projectile of theirs be used, and that it be loaded with a proprietary speedloader which holds 90 projectiles.
Glock 26
Walther PPK

Radio controlled models

Tokyo Marui was also at the forefront of the developing radio control hobby in the mid-1980s with a line of high-quality 1/10-scale electric buggies, monster trucks and even an unusual NASCAR Winston Cup stocker, all in kit form.  This kit of Bill Elliott's Coors Melling Ford Thunderbird was built on a four-wheel drive buggy chassis; despite that full-scale NASCAR racers are rear-wheel drive.  The body could be raised or lowered for either onroad or offroad use and two full sets of wheels and tires were included, pre-mounted sponge slick tires for onroad and knobby spiked rubber tires for offroad.  The Big Bear Datsun, a 1/12-scale monster truck topped with a Datsun pickup truck body, powered by a Mabuchi RS-380 motor and initially sold via mail order, was one of the best-selling radio controlled models of the period and contributed greatly to the hobby's growth.

Scale variations on the simple and strong Big Bear chassis included both regular and "Super Wheelie" versions of the Jeep CJ-7 Golden Eagle and Toyota FJ40 Land Cruiser, each lacking the oversized wheels and tires of the Big Bear and equipped instead with more scale-looking Goodyear offroad tires.  A proposed third version which would have been Marui's ninth release was that of a Mitsubishi Pajero, shelved due to licensing problems.  Twelve models were released in all, numbered 1 through 13 since the aforementioned ninth model never made it to market.

Strong competition by the end of the decade, especially from Tamiya and Kyosho, caused Marui to pull out of the hobby-grade R/C market.  They returned to the R/C market in 2000 with a still-popular line of ready-to-run, 1/24-scale military tanks (see below).

The company released and sold the following models:

Hunter 2WD entry-level sport buggy
Galaxy 2WD sport/mild competition buggy
Galaxy RS 2WD sport buggy
Shogun 4WD sport/mild competition buggy
Samurai 4WD competition buggy
Ninja 4WD competition buggy
Coors Melling Ford Thunderbird 4WD NASCAR stock car
Big Bear Datsun 2WD sport monster truck
CJ-7 Golden Eagle 2WD sport offroad, available in regular and "Super Wheelie"
Toyota Land Cruiser 2WD sport offroad, available in regular and "Super Wheelie"

Radio controlled battle tanks 
Tokyo Marui has combined remote control and airsoft by making a series of 1/24 scale remote controlled tanks that fire BBs. By remote control, a user may move the tank forwards and backwards, turn in place, rotate the turret, elevate the barrel, and fire. The range is only 25 m for 0.2g BBs. The tanks run on eight AA batteries.
Leopard 2 A6
Tiger I
Tiger I Camouflage
M1A2 Abrams
Type 90 Tank JGSDF 71st Regiment

Others
Tokyo Marui has also in an attempt to compete with Tamiya manufactured 1:24 scale model cars, Mini 4WD of their own RC cars as well as licensed by other companies including Kyosho and educational models. The early nineties recession would force the company to scale back production to airsoft guns. Tokyo Marui has since returned to the RC car market, albeit the lucrative mini RC market with its 1:24 cars  and also since 1994, builds remote driven Godzilla models. In 2007, Tokyo Marui released Z- scale model trains under the Pro-Z title including fully developed rail dioramas with several different trainsets. Recently, Tokyo Marui has entered the electric scooter market.

See also
Airsoft guns

References

Tokyo Marui: Soft Air Gun-2004 All Line Up Catalog

External links
Tokyo Marui website (Japanese)

Manufacturing companies based in Tokyo
Airsoft
Model manufacturers of Japan
Radio-controlled car manufacturers
Toy companies of Japan
Godzilla (franchise)